Orchis provincialis, the Provence orchid, is a species of orchid in the genus Orchis.

Description 
The 4-5 basal leaves are oblong-lanceolate, with a length of about 8 cm and arranged in a rosette, the color is green with purplish brown spots. The cauline leaves are sheathing the stem, with yellowish  lanceolate bracts. The inflorescence comprises 5 to 30 small flowers. Their color varies from creamy white or pale yellow to various shades of pink and purple in some varieties. The lateral sepals are ovate and erect, the median sepal is slightly leaning forward. The labellum is trilobed, with small spots  from orange to purple on the median lobe. The white spur is cylindrical and curved upward, longer than the ovary. The gynostegium is short, obtuse, with pale yellow pollen. This orchid blooms from March to June.

Distribution
The species has a Mediterranean distribution and it is widespread from north-western Africa, south-central and southern Europe to the Caucasus. It is native to: Albania, Bulgaria, Corse, East Aegean Is., France, Greece, Italy, Kriti, Krym, North Caucasus, Portugal, Sardegna, Sicilia, Spain, Switzerland, Transcaucasus, Turkey and Yugoslavia.

Habitat

Taxonomy
It was first described by Jean-Baptiste de Lamarck & Augustin Pyrame de Candolle and then widely published by Giovanni Battista Balbis in Syn. Pl. Fl. Gall. on page 169 in 1806.

Gallery

References

Other sources
 Pierre Delforge - Orchids of Europe, North Africa And the Middle East - 2006, Timber Press
 Pignatti S. - Flora d'Italia (3 voll.) - Edagricole – 1982, Vol. III
 Tutin, T.G. et al. - Flora Europaea, second edition - 1993

External links

 Biolib
 Orchis provincialis

provincialis
Plants described in 1806
Orchids of Europe